Arsen Aliyevich Akayev (born 28 December 1970) is a Russian professional football coach and a former player of Kumyk origin. He is an assistant coach with FC Dynamo Makhachkala.

Club career
He played 1 game in the UEFA Cup 2001–02 for FC Anzhi Makhachkala

Honours
Russian Cup finalist: 2001.

External links
 

1970 births
People from Khasavyurt
Living people
Russian footballers
Association football defenders
Russian Premier League players
FC Anzhi Makhachkala players
Russian football managers
Russian Premier League managers
FC Anzhi Makhachkala managers
Kumyks
FC Dynamo Makhachkala players
Sportspeople from Dagestan